C.S.I Boys Higher Secondary School (formerly known as London Mission high School & Union High School) was founded in 1831 as the first school in Coimbatore established by the English. 

Over 2000 students attend every year. It was founded by the Church of South India (CSI).

External links 
 

Church of South India schools
Boys' schools in India
Christian schools in Tamil Nadu
High schools and secondary schools in Tamil Nadu
Schools in Coimbatore
Educational institutions established in 1831
1831 establishments in India